Alexander Turnquist (born 1988 in Idaho) is an American guitarist and composer. He has released original albums on the VHF record label as well as limited released titles on the Kning Disk imprint and Textura record label. Turnquist has been compared to guitarists Jack Rose, Alex De Grassi, Kaki King, and James Blackshaw, as well as contemporary composer Philip Glass.

Turnquist's first widely released album, Faint at the Loudest Hour (VHF Records 2007), was given high marks, with an 8.2 from the popular music review website Pitchfork.

Discography

References

External links
 

Living people
1988 births
Guitarists from Idaho
American male guitarists
21st-century American guitarists
21st-century American male musicians
Western Vinyl artists